Autopista 30 de Mayo is a highway in the Dominican Republic. The highway serves as a junction of the capital Santo Domingo, Dominican Republic and its adjacent city (part of the metropolitan area), San Cristóbal. It is a small highway, usually with heavy traffic, and passes through the Haina Port, the biggest port in the Dominican Republic. The eastern terminus is at the George Washington Avenue in the city coast and the western terminus lies at the city center of San Cristobal and then unites to the new section of DR-2 in the western part of San Cristobal.

History

The highway is an old decommissioned part of national highway DR-2.

The highway is named 30 de Mayo due to the assassination of Dominican dictator Rafael Leonidas Trujillo Molina on May 30, 1961 on that highway.

See also

 Highways and Routes in the Dominican Republic

References 

Highways and routes in the Dominican Republic